Robert Heath Foxworth (born November 1, 1941) is an American film, stage, and television actor.

Early life
Foxworth was born in Houston, Texas, the son of Erna Beth (née Seamman), a writer, and John Howard Foxworth, a roofing contractor. He attended Lamar High School and earned a Bachelor of Fine Arts degree in acting at Carnegie Mellon University.

Career
Foxworth first gained attention as a stage actor, particularly at Washington, DC's Arena Stage. He was offered the role of J. R. Ewing in Dallas, but turned it down and Larry Hagman was cast.

Among his numerous film and television roles, such as in the television series The Storefront Lawyers (1970–1971), Foxworth is best known for his stints on Falcon Crest (he played Jane Wyman's long-suffering nephew, Chase Gioberti, from 1981–1987) and Six Feet Under (he played Bernard Chenowith from 2001–2003), as well as a starring role in Gene Roddenberry's 1974 movie The Questor Tapes. He also appeared in the episode "All My Tomorrows" of the NBC romantic anthology series Love Story in 1973 and in the episode "The Mask of Adonis" from the 1977 NBC science fiction-horror anthology series Quinn Martin's Tales of the Unexpected (known in the United Kingdom as Twist in the Tale). He had a guest-starring role on the seventh season of The West Wing and a guest spot on Law & Order.

Foxworth played the murderer, an Army colonel, in "Grand Deceptions," a 1989 episode of the TV series Columbo. He has also guest-starred in Hawaii Five-O, Password Plus, Murder, She Wrote, seaQuest DSV, Star Trek: Deep Space Nine, The Outer Limits, Star Trek: Enterprise, Stargate SG-1, and Babylon 5. He has done voice acting as the corrupt Professor Hamilton on Justice League Unlimited. He also voiced the Autobot Ratchet, in the film version of Transformers and its sequels.

Personal life
Foxworth was married from 1964 until 1974 to Marilyn McCormick, with whom he had two children, including actor Bo Foxworth. Foxworth was married to actress Elizabeth Montgomery from 1993 until her death in 1995.  They had been together for 20 years before marrying. Foxworth later married Stacey Thomas on August 2, 1998.

TV and filmography

1970–1971: The Storefront Lawyers as David Hansen
1971: The Mod Squad as Dr. Gary Lefferts
1972: Streets Of San Francisco as Hailey
1973: Frankenstein as Dr. Victor Frankenstein
1973: Hawaii Five-O as Dr. Eric Fowler
1974: Mrs. Sundance as Jack Maddox
1974: The Questor Tapes as Questor
1974: Barnaby Jones as Whit Brewer
1975: Cannon as Lanny McCrea 
1976: Treasure of Matecumbe as Jim Burnie
1976: Quincy, M.E. as Congressman Charles Sinclair
1977: Airport '77 as Chambers
1978: Invisible Strangler (aka The Astral Factor) as Lt. Charles Barrett
1978: Damien: Omen II as Paul Buher
1979: Password Plus (with Elizabeth Montgomery and Marcia Wallace, 10 episodes) as Himself
1979: Prophecy as Rob
1980: The Black Marble as Sgt. A.M. Valnikov
1980: The Memory of Eva Ryker as Norman Hall
1981: Peter and Paul as Peter the Fisherman
1981–1987: Falcon Crest as Chase Gioberti
1988: Cagney & Lacey S6/E21-22 as Agent Duggan
1989: Beyond the Stars as Richard Michaels
1994: seaQuest DSV as Royce Shelton
1994: Babylon 5 – "Points of Departure", "All Alone in the Night" as General William Hague
1995: Murder, She Wrote as Prof. Harry Matthews
1996: Star Trek: Deep Space Nine - "Homefront" and "Paradise Lost " as Admiral Leyton
1996: The Outer Limits - "Trial by Fire" as Charles Halsey
1996: The Real Adventures of Jonny Quest as Roger T. "Race" Bannon/Vladimire Oistrakh/Captain Briggs/Goon #2
1997–2003: Law & Order as Dr. Frederick Barrett / Professor Charles Evans
1998–1999: LateLine (17 episodes) as Pearce McKenzie
2000–2005: Law & Order: Special Victims Unit as Dr. Lett / Dr. Ben Hadley
2001–2003: Six Feet Under (6 episodes) as Dr. Bernard Chenowith
2003: Jeremiah as President Emerson
2003: Stargate SG-1 as Chairman Ashwan
2004: Star Trek: Enterprise - "The Forge", "Awakening", and "Kir'Shara" as Administrator V'Las
2004-2005: Justice League Unlimited as (6 episodes) Professor Hamilton
2005: Law & Order: Special Victims Unit as Dr. Lett / Dr. Ben Hadley
2005: Syriana as Tommy Barton
2005: The West Wing as Senator George Montgomery
2006: Bones as Branson Rose
2006: Brothers & Sisters as Harry Packard
2006: Boston Legal as Judge Simon Devon
2007: Transformers as Ratchet (voice)
2007: Kiss the Bride as Wayne
2009: Transformers: Revenge of the Fallen as Ratchet (voice)
2011: Transformers: Dark of the Moon as Ratchet (voice)
2014: Transformers: Age of Extinction as Ratchet / Leadfoot (voice) 
2019 A.C (Short)

Television films
1971: Hogan's Goat
1973: The Devil's Daughter as Steve Stone
1973: The Wide World of Mystery (Frankenstein) as Dr. Victor Frankenstein
1974: Mrs. Sundance as Jack Maddox
1974: The Questor Tapes as Questor
1977: It Happened at Lakewood Manor as Mike Carr
1978: Deathmoon as Jason Palmer
1980: The Memory of Eva Ryker as Norman Hall
1981: Peter and Paul as Peter
1988: Double Standard as Leonard Harik
1989: Columbo: Grand Deceptions as Frank Brailie
1990: Face to Face (Hallmark Hall of Fame presentation) as Tobias Williams
1992: With Murder in Mind as Bob Sprague
2006: The Librarian: Return to King Solomon's Mines as Uncle Jerry

Video games
2009: Transformers: Revenge of the Fallen (Xbox/PS3) as Ratchet (voice)

References

External links

 
 
 

1941 births
20th-century American male actors
21st-century American male actors
Carnegie Mellon University alumni
Lamar High School (Houston, Texas) alumni
Male actors from Houston
American male film actors
American male stage actors
American male television actors
American male voice actors
Living people